Skyhook is a location technology company based in Boston, Massachusetts, that specializes in location positioning, context, and intelligence. Founded in 2003, Skyhook originally began by geolocating Wi-Fi access points. It has since then has been focusing on hybrid positioning technology, which incorporates with Wi-Fi, GPS, cell towers, IP address, and device sensors to improve device location.

History 
Skyhook was founded in 2003 by Ted Morgan and Michael Shean. Skyhook's database was initially gathered through wardriving, when the company sent teams of drivers around the United States, Canada, Western Europe and selected Asian countries to map out Wi-Fi hot spots.

Skyhook powers location-based services for companies such as Apple, Samsung, Sony, HP, Dell, Sharp, Philips and MapQuest.

The firm received its first patent in 2007, and as of early 2020 holds over 650 patents across the United States and foreign markets.

In 2010, Skyhook sued Google over the use of Wi-Fi locator technology in cell phones. The complaint claimed that Andy Rubin, Google's Vice President for Engineering, gave Sanjay K. Jha, Chief Executive of Motorola's mobile devices' division, a “stop ship” order, preventing Motorola from shipping phones with the Android operating system using the Skyhook software. The litigation was settled in 2015: Skyhook received $90 million in a settlement with the tech giant, a third of which was consumed by legal fees. The figure was revealed in a securities filing by Liberty Broadband Corp., Skyhook's Colorado-based parent company.

In February 2014, Skyhook Wireless was acquired by True Position Inc, a subsidiary of Liberty Broadband. In 2016, the two companies merged under the Skyhook brand, which now rests under Liberty Broadband, which is a part of the Liberty Media family.

In 2016 Skyhook launched new products dedicated to the advertising technology market: Retailer Personas, Power Personas, and On-Demand Personas. These solution, based on Skyhook's processing of billion location points, help marketers finely target consumers based on where they have been in order to personalize mobile marketing campaigns.

In February 2019 Skyhook announced that it is working closely with Qualcomm Technologies to bring Wi-Fi positioning and location-assistance services based on Qualcomm Snapdragon Wear platforms.

In September 2019, Mozilla announced changes to commercial use of its Mozilla Location Service, which caused SailfishOS location services not being able to use the service any more. The changes were made due to patent infringement allegations by Skyhook.

In February 2020, Deutsche Telekom announced that Skyhook was among its new technology partners for IoT Solution Optimizer, an ecosystem of company developed to “scale-up IoT business faster, and support enterprises of all sizes wanting to succeed in the Internet of Things.“

In April 2020, Skyhook partnered with Kyocera to provide accurate location services to DuraXV Extreme, a rugged flip phone.

Coverage 
To pinpoint location, Skyhook uses a reference network composed of the known locations of over 5 billion Wi-Fi access points and 250 million cellular towers, . Skyhook's coverage area includes most major metro areas in North America, Europe, Asia and Australia. The system can also be used to enhance the performance of GPS enabled devices where GPS reception is weak.

Precision Location SDK 
Skyhook offers a software development kit (SDK), which allows developers to create location-enabled applications using Skyhook's software-only Hybrid Positioning System on the platform of their choice.

The SDK supports Android 2.2 (Froyo), 2.3.x (Gingerbread), 4.0.x (Ice Cream Sandwich), and 4.1.x (Jelly Bean), 4.4 (KitKat), 5.0-5.1 (Lollipop), and 6.0 (Marshmallow) including forked platforms such as the Kindle Fire, along with Linux, Windows, and Mac OS X.

Context SDK 
In 2013, Skyhook launched Context, which uses Skyhook's location network along with venue data to give mobile users awareness of the world around them. It  enables personalized mobile experiences and enhanced revenue opportunities using 1st Party Location Network and precisely located venues.

The SDK requires iOS 6.0+ and a device with region monitoring support: iPhone 4+, iPad (Wi-Fi only) 3+, iPad (Wi-Fi + Cell) 2+, iPad Mini, iPad Air, iPod Touch 5+.  The Android SDK is supported on Android 2.2 (Froyo), 2.3.x (Gingerbread), 4.0.x (Ice Cream Sandwich), 4.1.x-4.3 (Jelly Bean), 4.4 (KitKat), 5.0-5.1 (Lollipop), and 6.0 (Marshmallow) including forked platforms such as the Kindle Fire.

Competitors 
Skyhook's main competitors include Google, HERE, Unwired Labs, Mozilla and Combine. The latter was sued by Skyhook in 2019. Skyhook and Google announced a collaboration in a common press release issued in April 2020.

See also 
 Hybrid positioning system
 Mobile phone tracking
 Local Positioning Systems
 Wi-Fi positioning system

References

External links 
 Skyhook Wireless corporate website
 Meet The Location Data Company That, Literally, Put The Blue Dot On The Map
 Skyhook Wireless brings location services to wearables in a petit package- TechCrunch
 Skyhook Launches its new Personas to help solve a $100B industry problem - VentureBeat
 Skyhook Gets Shoutout by Steve Jobs at MacWorld
 USA Today: Steve Jobs, iPhone have Skyhook pointed in right direction

Geomarketing
Wi-Fi
Companies based in Boston
Software companies based in Massachusetts
Location-based software
Software companies of the United States
American companies established in 2003
2003 establishments in Massachusetts
Software companies established in 2003